Ngô Quang Tùng, known by his stage name Tommy Ngô, is a contemporary Vietnamese singer for Paris By Night. He was born in Đà Lạt, Vietnam, and lived in Saigon until 1975 when his family moved to the United States. He lived in Iowa for 19 years before moving to California. He is married to Lynda Trang Đài.

References

Living people
20th-century Vietnamese male singers
Singers of Vietnamese descent
American musicians of Vietnamese descent
1971 births